Nirantharam - The Incessant is a 1995 Indian Telugu-language drama film, written and directed by C. Rajendra Prasad.

Plot
The story is set against the backdrop of the 1948 Telangana Rebellion.

Production
Produced by Chandra Siddhartha and the Film and Television Institute of India, the film was screened at the Cairo International Film Festival.

Cast
Raghubir Yadav
Subhalekha Sudhakar
Suhas Palshikar
Madhukar Toradmal
Chinmayee Surve
Anantha Prabhu
M.B.K.V. Prasada Rao
Baby Manasa

References

1995 films
1990s Telugu-language films
Films set in Telangana
Films about discrimination
Films about the caste system in India
Films about prejudice
1995 direct-to-video films
Indian avant-garde and experimental films
Indian independent films
Films set in Hyderabad, India
Films about social issues in India
1990s avant-garde and experimental films
1995 independent films
1995 directorial debut films